This is a list of roads designated A17 or A-17. Entries are sorted in alphabetical order by country.

 A17 highway (Australia), a bypass road in Adelaide, South Australia
 A17 motorway (Belgium), a road connecting Bruges and Tournai 
 A 17 motorway (Germany), a road connecting Dresden and the Czech border

 A17 highway (Lithuania), a road connecting Panevėžio and aplinkkelis
 A17 road (Malaysia), a road in Perak connecting Parit and Bota Kanan
 A17 motorway (Netherlands), a road connecting the A16 motorway and the A58 motorway near Roosendaal

 A 17 road (Sri Lanka), a road connecting Galle and Madampe
 A17 road (United Kingdom) may refer to :
 A17 road (England), a road connecting Newark-on-Trent, Nottinghamshire and King's Lynn, Norfolk
 A17 road (Isle of Man), a road connecting Bride and the Andreas road
 A17 road (United States of America) may refer to :
 A17 road (California), a road connecting the I-5 and the SR 44

See also
 List of highways numbered 17